Wynoose is an unincorporated community in Richland and Wayne counties, Illinois, United States.

References

Unincorporated communities in Richland County, Illinois
Unincorporated communities in Wayne County, Illinois
Unincorporated communities in Illinois